Rudder Cut Cay Airport is a public use airport located near Rudder Cut Cay, the Bahamas.

See also
List of airports in the Bahamas

References

External links 
 Airport record for Rudder Cut Cay Airport at Landings.com

Airports in the Bahamas